is a passenger railway station located in the city of  Zentsūji, Kagawa Prefecture, Japan. It is operated by JR Shikoku and has the station number "D14".

Lines

Layout
Zentsūji Station is an above-ground station with one side platform and one island platform and three tracks. Platform 1 is the main platform for bi-directional traffic.  Platform 2 is used when there is an issue the outbound sub-main line. As a general rule, Platform 3 is used only when shunting limited express trains. The platforms are connected by a footbridge. The station is staffed, but is unattended in the early morning and after 19:00.

Adjacent stations

|-
!colspan=5|JR Shikoku

History
With the privatization of JNR on 1 April 1987, control of the station passed to JR Shikoku. The wooden station building was designated a Registered Tangible Cultural Property in 2002.

Surrounding area
Zentsū-ji, temple 75 on the Shikoku pilgrimage 
 Japan Ground Self-Defense Force Zentsuji Garrison
Jinsei Gakuen High School
Kagawa Prefectural Zentsuji First High School

See also
List of railway stations in Japan

References

External links

 Official home page

Railway stations in Kagawa Prefecture
Railway stations in Japan opened in 1889
Registered Tangible Cultural Properties
Zentsūji, Kagawa